Zhaoba Township is a township-level division of Shenze County, Shijiazhuang, Hebei, China.

References

Township-level divisions of Hebei
Shenze County